My Guitar Princess is a 2018 Philippine television drama series broadcast by GMA Network. Directed by Nick Olanka, it stars Julie Anne San Jose in the title role. It premiered on May 7, 2018 on the network's afternoon line up replacing Ang Forever Ko'y Ikaw. The series concluded on July 13, 2018 with a total of 50 episodes. It was replaced by Kapag Nahati ang Puso in its timeslot.

The series is streaming online on YouTube.

Premise
Celina, a daughter of a house help became famous online as the "Guitar Princess". Her mother was a former singer and was an employee of the Canadian Ambassador to the Philippines who had a Filipino wife and a son, Elton - Celina's childhood friend. They will eventually meet again, when Elton comes across a video of the Guitar Princess and instantly becomes a fan.

Cast and characters

Lead cast
 Julie Anne San Jose as Celina Raymundo-Soriano / Guitar Princess

Supporting cast
 Gil Cuerva as Elton Smith
 Kiko Estrada as Justin Garcia
 Sheryl Cruz as Adele Raymundo-Soriano
 Isabelle de Leon as Taylor Garcia / Guitar Empress
 Jazz Ocampo as Katy Garcia
 Kier Legaspi as Elvis Soriano
 Marc Abaya as Charlie
 Maey Bautista as Dolly
 Marika Sasaki as Britney
 Ralf King as Adam
 Rob Sy as Michael

Guest cast
 Frank Garcia as George
 Lui Manansala as Barbara
 Ex Battalion as themselves
 Mickey Ferriols as Mariah
 Jervy "Patani" Daño as Shakira
 Marissa Sanchez as Janet
  as Kim
 Petite as Whitney
 Venice Bismonte as young Celina
 Bryce Eusebio as young Elton

References

External links
 
 

2018 Philippine television series debuts
2018 Philippine television series endings
Filipino-language television shows
GMA Network drama series
GMA Integrated News and Public Affairs shows
Philippine musical television series
Television shows set in the Philippines